Sir Albert Eli Lind (21 February 1878 – 26 June 1964) was an Australian farmer and politician.

Early life
Lind was born in 1878 in East Charlton, Victoria, the son of Oliver Nicholas Lind, a farmer from Denmark, and his Welsh wife Mary Ann Clay. In 1882, drought forced the family to move to East Gippsland where Lind was educated at Lucknow, and then to Bairnsdale in 1884 where he attended Bairnsdale state school. By the age of 12, he was a builder's apprentice and worked in several trades. In 1904, then just married, Lind selected a 640-acre property at Mount Taylor, where he established a dairy farm with his brother Ernie.

Political career
Lind entered politics as a councillor for the Shire of Bairnsdale from 1914 to 1925. In October 1920, he was elected to the Victorian Legislative Assembly for the seat of Gippsland East for the Victorian Farmers' Union (VFU).

On 2 April, Lind was made Minister of Forests, President of the Board of Land and Works and Commissioner of Crown Lands and Survey in Albert Dunstan's cabinet.

On 13 October 1937, Lind was voted deputy leader of the United Country Party in an unexpected ballot at the party's pre-sessional meeting, and therefore became Deputy Premier of Victoria.

When John McDonald won government in 1950, Lind resumed his portfolios of lands and forests, as well as the additional portfolio of soldier settlement.

Lind was knighted in the 1951 King's Birthday honours for his service in the Victorian Legislative Assembly.

Family
Lind married Flora Catherine Arthur on 31 August 1904 at Bairnsdale. They had four sons and five daughters.

Lind was the uncle of Alan Lind, who was also a Member of the Legislative Assembly for the Labor Party, representing the districts of Mildura (1952–1955) and Dandenong (1969–1979).

References

1878 births
1964 deaths
Deputy Premiers of Victoria
Members of the Victorian Legislative Assembly
National Party of Australia members of the Parliament of Victoria
Australian Knights Bachelor
Australian politicians awarded knighthoods
Australian pastoralists
Australian people of Danish descent
Australian people of Welsh descent
People from Charlton, Victoria